The Sow is a 1992 Spanish rural comedy and adventure film directed and written by José Luis Cuerda which stars Alfredo Landa and Antonio Resines.

Plot 
Starting in the Summer of 1492, the plot shows the mishaps of the common folk (two vagrants, Bartolomé and Ruy, respectively a man freed from captivity in Tunis and a desertor from the Granada War accompanied by a sow) living badly in the Crown of Castile, seeking to embark on a caravel in the harbor of Palos.

Cast

Production 
The film is a Central de Producciones Audiovisuales and Antea Films production, and it also had support from the Ministry of Culture and Generalitat Valenciana. Shooting locations included Trujillo, Boadilla del Monte, La Alberca, and the Veruela Abbey.

Release 
The film had its world premiere at the Valladolid International Film Festival (Seminci) in October 1992. It was theatrically released in Spain on 6 November 1992.

Reception 
Ángel Fernández-Santos of El País deemed The Sow to be a "well made, amusing and a tad coarse" film, with a tendency to scatological humour and the picaresque novel dialogues.

Accolades 

|-
| rowspan = "2" align = "center" | 1993 || rowspan = "2" | 7th Goya Awards || Best Actor || Alfredo Landa ||  || rowspan = "2" | 
|-
| Best Cinematography || Hans Burmann || 
|}

See also 
 List of Spanish films of 1992

References 

Films set in the 1490s
Spanish historical comedy films
1990s Spanish films
1990s Spanish-language films
Films directed by José Luis Cuerda
Films shot in the province of Zaragoza
Films shot in the Community of Madrid
Films shot in the province of Cáceres
Films shot in the province of Salamanca